Charles Carter Schnetzler (June 3, 1930 – December 15, 2009) was a planetary scientist at NASA's Goddard Space Flight Center. Schnetzler is best known for analyzing moon rocks brought back by the Apollo program and for studying the Earth's environment using the Landsat and the Earth Observing System. Schnetzler was born in Whiting, Indiana and grew up in Neodesha, Kansas.  On November 4, 2009, Schnetzler was seriously injured after being hit by a car while walking near his home on Little Patuxent Parkway in Columbia, Maryland. He later died in his home on December 15, 2009.

Selected publications

References 

1930 births
2009 deaths
NASA people
People from Whiting, Indiana
People from Neodesha, Kansas
Planetary scientists
American Unitarian Universalists
American geochemists
Road incident deaths in Maryland
Pedestrian road incident deaths
People from Columbia, Maryland